Charles Irwin, VC (1824 – 8 April 1873), was born in Manorhamilton, County Leitrim, and was an Irish recipient of the Victoria Cross, the highest and most prestigious award for gallantry in the face of the enemy that can be awarded to British and Commonwealth forces.

Details
Irwin was approximately 33 years old, and a private in the 53rd Regiment of Foot (later The King's Shropshire Light Infantry), British Army during the Indian Mutiny when the following deed took place on 16 November 1857 at the Relief of Lucknow for which he was awarded the VC:

Further information
Service Record: 
 18th Regiment of Foot
 3168 53rd Shropshire Regiment
87th Regiment of Foot between Jan 1860 – 30 June 1860.

His entry in the Canon Lummis files states that: "Judging from numerous entries in the muster roles as to imprisonment, he appears to have been a bad hat."

He died on 29 March 1873 at Newtownbutler, County Fermanagh, Ireland, and was buried in Saint Mark's Churchyard (Aghadrumsee), near Magheraveely in the south-east of County Fermanagh.

Medal
His Victoria Cross is displayed at The King's Shropshire Light Infantry Museum.

References

Listed in order of publication year 
The Register of the Victoria Cross (1981, 1988 and 1997)

Ireland's VCs  (Dept of Economic Development, 1995)
Monuments to Courage (David Harvey, 1999)
Irish Winners of the Victoria Cross (Richard Doherty & David Truesdale, 2000)

External links
Location of grave and VC medal (Co. Fermanagh, Northern Ireland)

1824 births
1873 deaths
19th-century Irish people
British Army recipients of the Victoria Cross
British Army personnel of the Second Anglo-Burmese War
Indian Rebellion of 1857 recipients of the Victoria Cross
Irish recipients of the Victoria Cross
King's Shropshire Light Infantry soldiers
People from Manorhamilton
Royal Irish Fusiliers soldiers
Royal Irish Regiment (1684–1922) soldiers
Military personnel from County Leitrim
Burials in Northern Ireland